New Brighton is a master planned residential neighbourhood developed in the southeast of Calgary, Alberta. Located east of 52nd. Street SE and south of 130th Ave and McIvor Boulevard to the south. The community contains a variety of single family and multi-family homes as well as a private residents association recreation facility called the New Brighton Club. The facility contains a water park, hockey rink, tennis, banquet facilities and studio space with many programmed activities.

The community was designed by Carma Developers LP. The community maintains active online forums for residents and for neighbourhood program activities i.e. there is an interactive community website.

It is represented in the Calgary City Council by the Ward 12 councillor.

Demographics

See also
List of neighbourhoods in Calgary
Population as of 2011 is 7314 with an increase of 172.9% from 2007 - 2011

References

External links

Neighbourhoods in Calgary